Amia Brave (born 16 August 1995) is a 26-year-old British-Nigerian R&B artist with a unique voice and style. Her debut single, "Young & Misguided," was released in 2020 and features heartfelt lyrics and catchy melodies. Amia draws inspiration from artists such as Lucky Daye, Usher, Jazmin Sullivan, Keyisha Cole, Jay-Z, and Solange. She uses personal experiences and storytelling to create her music. Amia is a matured voice with a classic R&B sound mixed with a neo-take on the genre. Her music is a reflection of love, coming of age, and fighting for black faces worldwide. Despite her insecurities, Amia has set small goals for herself and hopes to achieve ultimate accolades such as the Grammy Awards.She is best known for her collaboration with British rapper ENNY on hit single Peng Black Girls.

Discography

Singles 

 Young and Misguided (2020)
 Sweet Love (2020)
Deja Vu (2021)

As featured artist 
 Peng Black Girls - Enny ft. Amia Brave (2020)
 Lost Ones Found - Mike'o ft. Amia Brave (2020)
 Conversations With Darkness - Fred Fredas ft. Amia Brave (2020)

References 

Living people
1995 births
British singer-songwriters
Nigerian singer-songwriters